The Chairman of the Legislative Assembly of the Republic of Karelia is the presiding officer of that legislature.

It was preceded by the Supreme Soviet.

Chairman of the Supreme Soviet of the Karelian Autonomous Soviet Socialist Republic (from 1991: The Republic of Karelia)

1994-2002 the legislature was bicameral.

Chairmen of the Chamber of the Republic of the Legislative Assembly of the Republic of Karelia

Chairmen of the Chamber of Representatives of the Legislative Assembly of the Republic of Karelia

Chairmen of the Legislative Assembly of the Republic of Karelia

Sources

The official website of the Legislative Assembly of the Republic of Karelia

Politics of the Republic of Karelia
Lists of legislative speakers in Russia